The NWA Pacific Northwest Television Championship was a professional wrestling championship sanctioned by the National Wrestling Alliance and defended in its member promotion Pacific Northwest Wrestling. It served as PNW's second-tier title, lasting from 1987 through 1990. As of March 2015, the championship was reactivated when Blue Collar Wrestling became the NWA's new Portland affiliate.

Title history

Footnotes

References

Pacific Northwest Wrestling championships
Television wrestling championships
National Wrestling Alliance championships
Regional professional wrestling championships